The men's 65 kg freestyle wrestling competitions at the 2014 Commonwealth Games in Glasgow, Scotland was held on 31 July at the Scottish Exhibition and Conference Centre.

Results
Results:

Bracket

Repechage

References

Wrestling at the 2014 Commonwealth Games